William H. Moore (1886-1961) was a politician, businessman, and livestock dealer.

Biography
Moore was born on November 13, 1886, in Gardner, Wisconsin. He graduated from Dollar Bay High School in Dollar Bay, Michigan in 1905. Moore was elected to the Wisconsin State Assembly as an Independent in 1932. He later became a Republican. Additionally, Moore was chairman and assessor of Nasewaupee, Wisconsin, was a member of the Nesewaupee School Board, and a member of the Door County, Wisconsin Board. Moore served as President of the Door County Mutual Insurance Company. Moore died on October 5, 1961.

References

People from Door County, Wisconsin
People from Houghton County, Michigan
Businesspeople from Wisconsin
Farmers from Wisconsin
School board members in Wisconsin
Mayors of places in Wisconsin
County supervisors in Wisconsin
Members of the Wisconsin State Assembly
Wisconsin Republicans
Wisconsin Independents
1886 births
1961 deaths
20th-century American politicians
20th-century American businesspeople